HMS Asheldham was one of 93 ships of the  of inshore minesweepers.

Their names were all chosen from villages ending in -ham. The minesweeper was named after Asheldham in Essex.

HMS Asheldham (Pennant number M2604) was a member of the first series of Ham-class minesweepers, with composite wood and aluminium construction. It was built by Philip and Son of Dartmouth, Devon and was completed on 9 September 1953.

Asheldham served as part of the 232nd Mine Sweeper Squadron at Harwich in Essex from 1954 to 1956, after which it was placed into reserve.  The Ham class had proved too small to carry modern minesweeping equipment and most of the class were withdrawn from use or transferred to secondary roles.

The ship was transferred to the Royal Malayan Navy on 1 April 1958, being renamed Sri Perlis. Following transfer, Sri Perlis 40mm Bofors gun and minesweeping gear was removed and replaced by three 20 mm Oerlikon cannon, although the minesweeping gear was later re-fitted, with the ship retaining a single Oerlikon gun.

References

Sources
 

Ham-class minesweepers
Ships built in Dartmouth
1953 ships
Cold War minesweepers of the United Kingdom
Royal Navy ship names
Ham-class minesweepers of the Royal Malaysian Navy